New York is a transitional American serif typeface created by Apple Inc. It was released to developers in June 2019. It is released by Apple freely but solely for use in developing or creating mock-ups of software on Apple platforms.

Originally codenamed Serif UI, it was first showcased in WWDC 2018 on June 4, 2018 when the new Apple Books app was introduced. It was exclusive to Apple Books on iOS 12; as a result, it was not available for download on the Apple Developer site. It was later released in four optical sizes with six weights each, under the name New York in June 2019 on the Apple Developer site. The font includes OpenType features for lining and text figures in both proportional and tabular widths.

Despite Apple having created a typeface with the same name with the bitmap format for the original Macintosh (later converted to TrueType vector format), it is unrelated to this design.

Usage 
Similar to San Francisco's usage, Apple also limits the usage of New York by others. According to its license, it is restricted to the design and development of applications for Apple's platforms.

See also 
 Typography of Apple Inc.
 San Francisco (sans-serif typeface)

References 

Apple Inc. typefaces
Transitional serif typefaces
Typefaces with optical sizes
Typefaces with text figures
Typefaces and fonts introduced in 2019